The Commissioner of Insurance is a statewide elected office in the U.S. state of North Carolina. The commissioner is a constitutional officer who leads the state's Department of Insurance. The commissioner also oversees the Office of the State Fire Marshal and sits on the North Carolina Council of State. The current commissioner is Mike Causey, who has held that office since January 1, 2017.

History of the office 
Oversight of insurance in North Carolina was originally entrusted to the North Carolina Secretary of State. On March 6, 1899 the North Carolina General Assembly created the Department of Insurance. The first Commissioner of Insurance was to be appointed to two-year terms, though the legislature selected the first commissioner; the day the insurance department was created, the legislature elected James R. Young to the commissionership. In 1907 the legislature scheduled a referendum to amend the state constitution to provide for the popular election of the commissioner to four-year terms beginning in 1908, which was successful. Young, who had been continuously reappointed to the office, was elected to a full term. The commissionership was made a constitutional office in 1944. A 1968 constitutional study commission recommended making the governor responsible for the selection of the commissioner to reduce voters' burden by shortening the ballot, but this proposal was disregarded by the General Assembly when it revised the state constitution in 1971. In the late 1940s the General Assembly made the insurance commissioner the State Fire Marshal. Commissioner James E. Long created a full-fledged Office of the State Fire Marshal within the Department of Insurance on April 1, 1998. The incumbent commissioner, Mike Causey, was sworn-in on January 1, 2017.

Powers, duties, and structure 

Article III, Section 7, of the Constitution of North Carolina stipulates the popular election of the Commissioner of Insurance every four years. The office holder is not subject to term limits. North Carolina is one of the few states to have an elected insurance commissioner. In the event of a vacancy in the office, the Governor of North Carolina has the authority to appoint a successor until a candidate is elected at the next general election for members of the General Assembly. Per Article III, Section 8 of the constitution, the commissioner sits on the Council of State. They are tenth in line of succession to the governor.

The Commissioner of Insurance leads the North Carolina Department of Insurance. The department regulates the sale of insurance in the state and licenses motor clubs premium financing firms, bail bondsmen, and collection agencies. The department has three groups: Public Services, which answers consumer queries and investigates insurance fraud; Company Services, which evaluates the financial condition of insurance companies and conducts actuarial studies; and Technical Services, which monitors rates and industry practices. As of December 2022, the department has 539 employees retained under the terms of the State Human Resources Act. The commissioner is ex officio State Fire Marshal of North Carolina, and the insurance department also houses the Office of the State Fire Marshal, which enforces the state fire code, manages the self-insurance fund for state-owned property, and provides training and support to fire and rescue squads. As with all Council of State officers, the commissioner's salary is fixed by the General Assembly and cannot be reduced during their term of office. In 2022, the commissioner's annual salary was $146,421. The Department of Insurance is housed in the Albemarle Building in downtown Raleigh.

List of Commissioners of Insurance

References

Works cited